Sentimenti is an Italian surname best known as the surname of several professional Italian football brothers from Bomporto in the Province of Modena. To differentiate them from one another, they are also known as "Sentimenti", with a Roman numeral. The members of the footballing family include:

 Ennio Sentimenti - Sentimenti I, played for Carpi amongst others as a midfielder
 Arnaldo Sentimenti - Sentimenti II, played for Napoli as a goalkeeper
 Vittorio Sentimenti - Sentimenti III, played for Juventus, Modena and Torino as an attacking midfielder
 Lucidio Sentimenti - Sentimenti IV, played for Juventus, Lazio and Italy as a goalkeeper
 Primo Sentimenti - Sentimenti V, played for Lazio as a defensive midfielder
 Lino Sentimenti - Sentimenti VI, played for Modena and others as a defender
 Andrea Sentimenti - Sentimenti VII, modern-day player who has played for Modena and most recently Castellarano as a goalkeeper

Others
Walter Sentimenti (1923–1987), Italian boxer

Italian-language surnames